Kekirawa Divisional Secretariat is a Divisional Secretariat  of Anuradhapura District, of North Central Province, Sri Lanka.

History

Prehisoric period 
Kekirawa has a long history which goes back to the pre-historical era. The ruins of that period can be founded around the Ritigala hills and some places situated in Anuradhapura District and Matale District  border. ( see also - Prehistory of Sri Lanka )

Legends 
There are few legends about Kekirawa . According to Valmiki's Ramayana Ritigala hills that situated in Kekirawa has been mentioned . Also many people in Sri Lanka , India and other south asian countries believe that there are many secrets of king Ravana has been hidden in this area. ( for more details see the article about Ritigala )

References
 Divisional Secretariats Portal
 Kekirawa Pradeshiya sabha

Divisional Secretariats of Anuradhapura District